Normal is a town in McLean County, Illinois, United States.  As of the 2020 census, the town's population was 52,736. Normal is the smaller of two principal municipalities of the Bloomington–Normal metropolitan area, and Illinois' seventh most populous community outside the Chicago metropolitan area. Chris Koos has been Normal's mayor since 2003.

The main campus of Illinois' oldest public university, Illinois State University, a fully accredited four-year institution, is in Normal, as is Heartland Community College, a fully accredited two-year institution. There was also a satellite campus of Lincoln College, which offered associate degrees as well as four-year programs.

History

The town was laid out with the name North Bloomington on June 7, 1854, by Joseph Parkinson. From its founding, it was generally recognized that Jesse W. Fell was the force behind the creation of the town. He had arranged for the new railroad, which would soon become the Chicago and Alton Railroad, to pass west of Bloomington then curving to cross the Illinois Central Railroad at a point where he owned or controlled land. Most of the original town lies south of these tracks, with Beaufort Street as its northern limit, and some blocks west of the Illinois Central and north of the tracks. Fell, his brothers, and associates quickly laid out many additions to the original town.

The town was renamed Normal in February 1865 and officially incorporated on February 25, 1867. The name was taken from Illinois State Normal University, a normal school (teacher-training institution) located there. The school has since been renamed Illinois State University after becoming a general four-year university. Normal is adjacent to Bloomington, Illinois, and when mentioned together they are known as the "Twin Cities", "Bloomington-Normal", "BN", or "BloNo".

In 2007, the town council voted to name the downtown area "Uptown Normal", and, as of 2011, Uptown Normal is home to the Children's Discovery Museum, Marriott Hotel and Conference Center, Hyatt Place Hotel, Uptown Station and Town Hall, and a variety of local shops and restaurants all centered around a roundabout. The district is also home to the historic and non-profit Normal Theater, a restored Art Deco theater owned by the Town of Normal that runs classic and independent films.

On August 31, 2021, a mass shooting occurred at a mobile home park in Normal that left three people dead and three more injured. The deceased were two women and a man, the latter being the gunman. He was killed by Normal Police Officers.

Awards
 November 19, 2014: Bronze Level Bicycle Friendly Community Award, League of American Bicyclists
 2014: First in State for Most Minutes Read, 2014 Scholastic Summer Reading Challenge, Scholastic Corp. - Received by Glenn Elementary
 2014: Chamber of the Year, Association of Chamber of Commerce Executives (ACCE) - Received by the McLean County Chamber of Commerce
 2013: Honorable Mention -  Mayor's Climate Protection Awards, United States Conference of Mayors - Received by Mayor Chris Koos
 2013: Tree Cities USA Community Award, Arbor Day Foundation
 2011: National Award for Smart Growth Achievement - Civic Places, United States Environmental Protection Agency

Geography
Normal is located near  (40.512189, −88.988701).

Climate

Demographics

As of the 2000 census, there were 45,386 people, 15,157 households, and 8,184 families residing in the town. The racial makeup of the town was 87.57% White, 7.71% African American, 0.15% Native American, 2.21% Asian, 0.04% Pacific Islander, 0.93% from other races, and 1.40% from two or more races. Hispanic or Latino of any race were 2.56% of the population.

There were 15,157 households, out of which 27.3% had children under the age of 18 living with them, 42.4% were married couples living together, 9.3% had a female householder with no husband present, and 46.0% were non-families. 26.6% of all households were made up of individuals, and 6.2% had someone living alone who was 65 years of age or older. The average household size was 2.43 and the average family size was 2.96.

In the town, the age distribution of the population shows 17.5% under the age of 18, 38.1% from 18 to 24, 23.1% from 25 to 44, 13.7% from 45 to 64, and 7.6% who were 65 years of age or older. The median age was 23 years. For every 100 females, there were 88.6 males. For every 100 females age 18 and over, there were 85.5 males.

The median income for a household in the town was $40,379, and the median income for a family was $60,644. Males had a median income of $41,323 versus $27,486 for females. The per capita income for the town was $17,775. About 5.6% of families and 19.3% of the population were below the poverty line, including 9.4% of those under age 18 and 3.9% of those age 65 or over.

Transportation
Normal is served by I-39, I-55, Interstate 74,  one railroad line, the Central Illinois Regional Airport (BMI) in neighboring Bloomington, and Connect Transit provides public bus service in the area.

Highways

Interstate Highways
 Interstate 39
 Interstate 55
 Interstate 74

US Highways
 US 51
 US 150
Illinois Highways
 Route 9

Interstate 55 wraps around the north and northwest edge of the town. Interstate 74 shares the I-55 roadway on the western edge of Normal before splitting off toward the northwest. Normal is the southern terminus of Interstate 39. Historic Route 66 runs through the town.

Airport
The Central Illinois Regional Airport is on Route 9 in Bloomington, approximately five miles east southeast from Uptown Normal. The airport is served by four airlines, five rental car agencies, and has direct daily flights to Atlanta, Chicago, Dallas-Ft. Worth, Detroit, and Minneapolis/St. Paul.  A record 559,481 passengers flew to or from CIRA in 2010.

Mass transit

Connect Transit has 11 color-coded fixed routes in the area; a lift-assisted paratransit service called NiteRide, which operates when Illinois State University is in session; and a campus shuttle for ISU called Redbird Express.

Rail
The Bloomington-Normal Amtrak station is in Normal at 11 Uptown Circle. It was designed by RATIO Architects. The station is served daily by four Lincoln Service trains in each direction between Chicago and St. Louis, and one Texas Eagle in each direction between San Antonio and Chicago. Three days a week, the Eagle continues on to Los Angeles. The station also serves connecting bus service to Peoria and Amtrak stations in Galesburg and Champaign/Urbana. It is Illinois' second busiest Amtrak station after Chicago, servicing nearly a quarter million passengers in fiscal year 2011. Traveling to Bloomington-Normal by Amtrak is a two and a half hour ride from St. Louis and Chicago.

Attractions

Recreation and entertainment

 The Children's Discovery Museum in uptown Normal provides hands-on exhibits, classes and programs for children.  The museum has three floors of exhibits including a two-story mesh climber for children to climb to the third floor and a  agriculture exhibit called AgMazing.  The museum also offers education programs and houses the Discover More! Store.  In 2010, the Children's Discovery Museum was deemed the best creative children's experience in Illinois by Media World USA's "Best of" Series.  The Children's Discovery Museum was subsequently featured on a Best of Illinois television program on CBS 2 WBBM Chicago and on the Travel Channel.
 The Illinois State University Planetarium offers a variety of science and astronomy programs for children from preschool to high-school.  The planetarium is located in Felmley Hall of Science on ISU's campus.  Public programs are usually offered on weekends and during special events.
 The Challenger Learning Center relocated to Heartland Community College in 2010. The Challenger Learning Center promotes leadership, communication, problem-solving and critical thinking skills while offering an interactive, simulated space and science experience through scheduled team missions for students, public and corporate groups.
The Normal Public Library first began as a Reading Room sponsored by the Community Council with Margaret Hanna overseeing the collection of three hundred books. In 1938, citizens voted to help support the library through donations. In 1973, the library moved to its current location at 206 W. College Avenue. As of 2018, the library's collection has grown to nearly 200,000 materials.

Nature and wildlife
 Normal offers many parks and facilities.  As of February 2011, there are 24 parks, facilities and trails operated by the Town of Normal: Carden Park, Children and Elders Forest, Children's Discovery Museum, Connie Link Amphitheater, Constitution Trail, David S. Anderson Park, East Detention Basin, Fairview Park, Fell Park, Fransen Park, Hidden Creek Nature Sanctuary, Ironwood Golf Course, Ironwood Park, Kelly Detention Basin, Martin Luther King Jr. Park, Maxwell Park, Normal Theater, Oak Street Ball Diamond, One Normal Plaza & Community Activity Center, Rosa Park Commons, Savannah Park, Shepard Park, Underwood Park, and the West Detention Basin.  Fairview and David S. Anderson parks include swimming pools; Fairview Park includes a skate park for in-line skating and skateboarding; Carden Park includes "Safety Town", a place for pre-school aged children to "drive" tricycles complete with traffic signs; and Maxwell Park has a fenced-in dog park and Champion Fields.
 The Bloomington-Normal Constitution Trail is a  jogging, walking, cycling, and rollerblading trail that has become a hit with the community.  The north–south segment of the trail follows the abandoned Illinois Central Gulf (ICG) railroad from Kerrick Road in Normal to Bell Street in Bloomington.  The east–west segment intersects the north segment at Normal City Hall Annex and continues east to Towanda-Barnes Road.  The Liberty Branch begins at Commerce Drive and ends at Old Farm Lakes Subdivision.  The Freedom Branch begins at Lincoln Street and ends at Route 9 West.  Parking is available at adjoining lots throughout the area.  The trail is open to walkers, runners, in-line skaters, skateboarders, cyclists, wheelchair users, and other non-motorized forms of transportation.  During winter months, it is not cleared of snow, and is available to skiers; weather permitting.
 The Ecology Action Center is a walk-in information and environmental education center for individuals, classes, workshops, and meetings.  Opened in 1995, it provides the community with practical workshops on recycling, composting and energy saving, nature walks and educational field trips for schools and groups.  Various publications and materials are available.

Golfing
In 2005, Golf Digest ranked Bloomington-Normal as the Fifth Best American City for Golf in their "Best in America" Metro Golf Rankings. Golf Digest ranked America's largest Metropolitan Statistical Areas on four different criteria: access to golf, weather, value of golf, and quality of golf.

 Ironwood Golf Course:  6,960 yards, Par 72, 18 holes.  Ironwood Golf Course, owned and operated by the Town of Normal Parks and Recreation Department, is a championship course that includes four water hazards and four sets of tees that range from 5,580 to 6,960 yards.  Ironwood's attributes, which include a grass tee driving range, large practice putting greens, a practice bunker, banquet room, pro shop, carts and individual or group lessons, offer a challenging test to players of all abilities.  The 18-hole course, which opened in 1990, has hosted high school regional, sectional and conference championship tournaments and numerous collegiate tournaments; as well as state amateur qualification tournaments.  Ironwood also hosts the COUNTRY Youth Classic each summer.
 Weibring Golf Club at Illinois State University: 6,730 yards, Par 71, 18 holes.  Weibring Golf Club, formerly known as University Golf Course, is located near the northwest corner of the Illinois State University campus.  The course was designed by golf course architect Robert Bruce Harris and opened for play in 1964.  Re-designed in 2000, the course features bent grass greens, tees and fairways, continuous cart paths from tee to green, strategically placed bunkers and a variety of tees for every skill level.  Weibring Golf Course has hosted IHSA Regional, Sectional and State Championships, NCAA Regional Championships and Intercollegiate Tournaments as well as annually hosting the COUNTRY Youth Classic.
 Golf Learning Center: Located at All Seasons, the Golf Learning Center is a synthetic turf facility, named one of the top 100 American golf ranges by Golf Range Magazine.

Arts and theatre

Facilities
 Braden Auditorium, located inside Illinois State University's Bone Student Center, serves as the hub of student life at ISU and a landmark resource to the Bloomington-Normal community.  The Auditorium seats 3,457.  Eight to ten annual shows feature a variety of Broadway musicals, pop and country stars, touring variety shows, comedians and big name performers.
 The Town of Normal Parks and Recreation Department's "Normal Summer Music Theatre" program celebrated its 40th season in 2011.  This program invites students in grades 8–12 to perform in two different productions each summer at the Connie Link Amphitheater.
 Heartland Theatre Company performs a number of plays every season. Heartland's Annual 10-Minute Play Festival attracts playwrights from all over the country and their "New Plays from the Heartland" Midwest One-Act Play Competition allows winning playwrights from eight Midwest states to share their original works with audiences.
 The Illinois State University Center for the Performing Arts provides the ISU campus and greater Central Illinois community with a wide variety of cultural activities. More than 20,000 people attend annual performances produced by the Illinois State University Schools of Music and Theatre in the center and all performances are open to the public.
 The Prairie Fire Theatre is a not-for-profit organization, incorporated in 1998.  All events are performed and directed by local talent, drawing from a largely untapped but highly skilled pool of professional artists.

Annual events
 Make Music Normal has coincided with the international Make Music day in June since 2013. The two-day festival highlights musicians from the Central Illinois area on multiple stages around Uptown. Local artists and vendors complete the festival atmosphere.
 The Sugar Creek Arts Festival is held each July in Uptown Normal.  The combination of high-quality art, live music and food has kept the streets of Normal full of color and activity for over 22 years.  The festival has a unique trait- only original pieces of artwork are shown; not copies of prints or items purchased overseas.  The Sugar Creek Arts Festival, hosted by the McLean Country Arts Center, is one of the largest art festivals in Central Illinois and continues to grow.
 The Sweet Corn Blues Festival is held each August in Uptown Normal and features over 50,000 ears of fresh sweet corn, sidewalk sales, arts, crafts and flea market vendors. The festival also serves as a welcome back for students at Illinois State University.
 Beginning in 1978 with twenty-one performances on the tennis courts of Ewing Manor, the Illinois Shakespeare Festival has grown to become an internationally recognized company; now putting on thirty-six performances each season in a state-of-the-art, Elizabethan-style theater.  In 2009, the Illinois Shakespeare Festival was named one of the ten best theatre festivals anywhere by author Susan Magsamen in her book, "The 10 Best of Everything Families: An Ultimate Guide for Travelers", published by National Geographic.

Historic sites

 the Illinois Soldiers' and Sailors' Children's School, operated from 1865 until 1979, when it was officially closed. The reasons for closure included a rising high per capita cost of care, the deterioration of many campus buildings, and dwindling numbers of children referred by state agencies. Though several of the original structures have been abandoned and left derelict, others have been converted for a number of uses. These include a seniors community, a commercial pool providing swim lessons, and a community football field.

These three locations are listed in the National Register of Historic Places:
 Camelback Bridge
 John W. Cook Hall
 Normal Theater opened in 1937 and was the first theater in Bloomington-Normal built specifically for sound films.  The strong art-deco design was, at the time, very avant-garde for a small Illinois town.  The Normal Theater has been completely restored to its original condition.  In addition to showing classic movies and independent films, the theater is used for a variety of activities including group outings, meetings and other events where assembly seating is required.

In December 2010, a Route 66 Wayside Exhibit was installed at the historic Sprague's Super Service building in Normal.  The exhibit tells the story of Route 66's great significance and impact on the community.  Visitors are welcome anytime during daylight hours.

Retail
The town's major retail center is on Veterans Parkway on the east side of town. It includes The Shoppes at College Hills, an outdoor mall on the site of the former College Hills Mall.  As of April 2011, The Shoppes at College Hills includes Ann Taylor Loft, Bath & Body Works, Chico's, Coldwater Creek, Colorific, Enterprise Rent-A-Car, Flat Top Grill, Gordmans, Hampton Inn & Suites, Hobby Lobby, J. Jill, Joe's Stationhouse Pizza Pub, Jos. A. Bank, Lane Bryant, Motherhood Maternity, Portrait Innovations, Starbucks, Target, The Children's Place, Verizon Wireless Premium Retailer/The Digital Store, Vitamin World, Von Maur and Yankee Candle.

The Constitution Trail Center on the corner of N. Main Street and Raab Road contains a variety of stores, restaurants and entertainment venues including Schnucks, AMC CLASSIC Normal 14, Bronze Giraffe Antiques, Pet Supplies Plus and Anytime Fitness.

Sports

Facilities
 Redbird Arena is a 10,200-seat sports arena at Illinois State University.  The arena is the home to the Illinois State Redbirds men's and women's basketball and volleyball teams.  In addition, the arena also hosts the Illinois High School Association Girls Volleyball State Finals, Illinois High School Association Girls Basketball State Finals, Gamma Phi Circus, concerts, tournaments, conferences, job fairs, and other events.
 Champion Fields at Maxwell Park has a seating capacity of 2,300 and 10 lighted softball fields.  The fields are divided into three areas; each equipped with a concessions stand, restrooms and seating for spectators.  Champion Fields has played host to state, national and world softball events since 1996 including the NJCAA Division II Softball National Championship, Amateur Softball Association (ASA) Girls’ 18-Under Fastpitch National Tournament, and the State Farm Illinois Collegiate Softball Championship.
 The Corn Crib is a multi-purpose stadium with a capacity of 7,000 patrons.  The Corn Crib is home to the Normal CornBelters baseball team of the Prospect League and has been selected to host the Illinois High School Association Class 1A Boys Soccer State Finals through 2015.
 Hancock Stadium is a 13,391-seat multi-purpose stadium at Illinois State University. The stadium is home to the Illinois State Redbirds football team, while also playing host to several annual events such as the State of Illinois Invitational High School Marching Band Championship and the Special Olympics State Summer Games. The newly renovated stadium includes 7 luxury boxes and 500 club seats, all of which provide access to the 5,500 square foot Hancock Stadium Club, which plays host to a variety of events outside football games, including receptions, banquets, weddings, and private events. The stadium is also highlighted by the addition of a 26 ft x 47 ft Daktronics 15HD LED Video Display in the north endzone.

Teams

 Illinois State Redbirds - Illinois State University Sports Teams
 Heartland Hawks - Heartland CC Sports teams
 Twin City Storm - minor league football team @ Hancock Stadium of the MFL and MLFA

Education

Primary and secondary schools

Public schools
The Town of Normal is in the McLean County Unit District No. 5.
 Normal Community West High School (NCWHS)
 Normal Community High School (NCHS) 
 Kingsley Junior High School (KJHS)
 Parkside Junior High School (PJHS)
 Chiddix Junior High School (CJHS)
 Evans Junior High School (EJHS)
 Parkside Elementary
 Oakdale Elementary
 Fairview Elementary
 Grove Elementary
 Glenn Elementary
 Colene Hoose Elementary
 Prairieland Elementary
 Sugar Creek Elementary
 Brigham Elementary
 Fox Creek Elementary
 Northpoint Elementary
 Pepper Ridge Elementary
 Benjamin Elementary

There are also two schools in Normal that are operated by Illinois State University.  They are:
 University High School
 Thomas Metcalf Elementary

Private schools
 Cornerstone Christian Academy, a Christian preschool through 12th grade school on the SE side of the area. 
 Epiphany Catholic School, a Roman Catholic primary and middle school, is in Normal.
 Calvary Christian Academy, a Christian pre-K through 12th grade school in Normal.
 Trinity Lutheran School, a Christian pre-K through 8th grade school in Bloomington.

Colleges and universities
Normal is also home to two centers of higher learning.

 Illinois State University, founded in 1857, was the first public university in the state, and is one of the Midwest's oldest institutions of higher education.  It is a co-educational, residential university with an emphasis on the undergraduate program, offering more than 160 fields of undergraduate study.  The Graduate School coordinates 38 masters, two specialist and seven doctoral programs.  The  campus includes over 60 major buildings with state-of-the-art technology. Watterson Towers is one of the tallest dorm buildings in the world.  From meeting facilities to cultural opportunities through the arts and excitement of numerous sporting events each year, ISU is a vital part of the Bloomington-Normal community.

 Heartland Community College has more than 4,800 students, and is the youngest community college in Illinois.  Heartland Community College offers training in more than 40 career fields in innovative and technologically progressive leaning facilities.  Classrooms and labs combine the latest advances in technology with the type of personal, hands-on instruction students need to reach their academic goals.  The HCC Campus features a library, community meeting spaces, a pond, bookstore, café and numerous locations for students to study or work on school projects.  Recently, Heartland completed a new Corporate Education Center and founded an athletic program that includes baseball, softball and men's and women's soccer teams.

Trade schools
 Paul Mitchell The School was designed to teach students skills they will need, inspire them to explore their passion and creativity, and help them learn the business that will make their career in the beauty industry fun and rewarding.
 Midwest College of Cosmetology provides professional training courses in cosmetology, nails, massage therapy, instructor training, skin care and hair removal. The program also includes professional rules and regulations, anatomy and physiology, salon business management, customer relations, and marketing.
 Bloomington-Normal School of Radiography

Weekend education
Bloomington/Normal Japanese Saturday School (ブルーミントン・ノーマル補習授業校 Burūminton Nōmaru Hoshū Jugyō Kō), a Japanese weekend school, was established in 1986 and held at the Thomas Metcalf School. It has a separate office in Normal.

Police
The Normal Police Department consists of approximately 81 sworn officers and 26 civilian staff. The Chief of Police is Rick Bleichner. The department is nationally accredited by the Commission for Accreditation for Law Enforcement Agencies.

The department provides 24-hour town wide coverage. In addition to deploying officers in patrol cars, the department also deploys officers on bike patrols and has been doing so since the 1980s. The department also has a full-time Criminal Investigation Division and two full service canines.

Media

Print
 The Pantagraph, local newspaper – daily 
 Normalite newspaper — weekly
 The Vidette, ISU student newspaper − semiweekly

FM radio
 88.1 WESN, Illinois Wesleyan University College radio
 89.1 WGLT, Illinois State University Jazz
 91.5 WCIC, Christian AC (RDS)
 93.7 WJBC-FM, Nash FM/Nash Icons (RDS)
 94.9 WXRJ-LP, Community radio
 96.7 WIHN "96.7 I-Rock", Active rock (RDS)
 97.9 WBBE "97.9 Bob FM", Adult hits (RDS)
 98.9 W255AI (Translates 91.5 WCIC), Christian AC (RDS)
 99.5 WZIM "Magic 99.5", AC (RDS)
 100.1 W261BK (Translates 88.5 WBNH), Religious Music
 100.7 WWHX "Hits 100.7", CHR (RDS)
 101.5 WBNQ, CHR/Pop (RDS – Artist/Title)
 103.3 WZND-LP "Fuzed Radio", Illinois State University student radio station Top 40 (Also simulcast on cable channel 4 available in student dorm rooms) (RDS)
 104.1 WBWN "B 104", Country (RDS – Artist/Title)
 107.7 WIBL "The Bull 107.7", Country  (RDS)

AM radio
 1230 WJBC, News/Talk

In the media
 The chorus of "I Got High" by Clem Snide (The Meat of Life, 429 Records) includes the lyrics:

"I got high with a Sufjan Stevens fan in Normal, Illinois
And this song goes out to all you beautiful
American girls and boys"

 "Normal" by Big Country (Restless Natives & Rarities, 1998)
 Ten Minutes From Normal by Karen Hughes (Viking Press, 2004)
 Way to Normal by Ben Folds (2008)

Companies
 The original Steak 'n Shake restaurant opened in Normal in 1934.
 Mitsubishi Motors North America and Chrysler Corporation established a manufacturing plant under the joint venture Diamond-Star Motors in 1986. It was Mitsubishi's only North American car manufacturing facility. It was closed May 31, 2016, and purchased by Rivian Automotive in January 2017.
Farnsworth Group, a national architecture and engineering firm with over 500 employees, announced it will be relocating its headquarters to Uptown Normal in the 5-story, $30M, Trail East Development expected to open in 2020.  Afni, a national customer service firm, and Illinois State University's Small Business Development Incubator (SBDI) are also expected to move into Trail East.
 Rivian's largest U.S. manufacturing plant is in Normal, where it builds all-electric trucks since 2021. Amazon has ordered more than 100,000 electric vehicles to be built at the plant. The New York Times has described how the company has had a transformational effect on Normal.

Notable people

 Andrew Bacevich, historian and author; born in Normal
 Edna Dean Baker, educator and college president; born in Normal
Keita Bates-Diop, 48th overall pick of the 2018 NBA Draft
 Wally Bishop, cartoonist; born in Normal
 Jon Bowermaster, oceans expert, journalist, filmmaker and adventurer; born in Normal
 Eleanor Coen, artist; born in Normal
 Ellen Crawford, actress; born in Normal
 Jim Crews, basketball coach at Saint Louis University
 Pop Dillon, first baseman for the Pittsburgh Pirates, Detroit Tigers, Baltimore Orioles and Brooklyn Superbas; born in Normal
 Robert B. Duncan, US congressman from Oregon
 Colton Dunn, comedian, actor, and writer, notable for his work on Key & Peele.
 Kevin Eggan, professor of molecular biology at Harvard University; born in Normal
 Robert S. Ellwood, expert on world religions; born in Normal
 Carrie Etter, poet; residing in the U.K. since 2001
 Jeff Fowler, director
 Jesse Hibbs, film director and college football star; born in Normal
 Richard Hovey, poet; born in Normal
 Michael Jantze, comic book author; raised in Normal
 Pokey LaFarge, American roots & blues musician & singer, spent teenage years in Normal
 Ryan Martinie, bassist; raised in Normal
 Ralph Eugene Meatyard, photographer; born in Normal
 Ogonna Nnamani, member of the US Olympic volleyball team; born in Normal
 Andrew Osenga, musician and songwriter
 Awadagin Pratt, musician; raised in Normal
 Gordon Ropp, Illinois state representative and farmer; born in Normal
 Roger Sedarat, poet; born in Normal
 McLean Stevenson, actor; born in Normal
 Brock Stewart, pitcher for Toronto Blue Jays; born in Normal
 Robert C. Underwood, Chief Justice of the Illinois Supreme Court; lived in Normal
 David Foster Wallace, award-winning author, professor at Illinois State University in Normal (1993–2002)

Sister cities

  Bloomington, Illinois
  Asahikawa, Hokkaido, Japan
  Vladimir, Russia
  Canterbury, Kent, United Kingdom
  Upper Nazareth, Israel
  Nazareth, Israel
  Ramallah, Palestine
  Caibarién, Cuba
  Remedios, Cuba
  Milton Keynes, United Kingdom

References

External links

 Town of Normal Official website 
 The Bloomington-Normal Area Convention and Visitors Bureau Official source of visitor information for the Bloomington-Normal area
Normal once center for commercial tomato, corn canning - Pantagraph (Bloomington, Illinois newspaper)

1867 establishments in Illinois
Populated places established in 1867
Towns in McLean County, Illinois
Towns in Illinois